Jump Jilani is a 2014 Telugu comedy film directed by E. Sattibabu. The film stars Allari Naresh, Isha Chawla, and Swathi Deekshith in lead roles with Kota Srinivasa Rao and Posani Krishna Murali portraying supporting roles. The film was a remake of Tamil film Kalakalappu (2012). Naresh plays dual roles.

Cast 

 Allari Naresh as Sathibabu and Rambabu
 Swathi Deekshith as Ganga
 Isha Chawla as Madhavi 
 Kota Srinivasa Rao as Sathibabu and Rambabu's grandfather
 Posani Krishna Murali as Ugra Narasimha Reddy 
 Raghu Babu as Dharmaraju
 M.S. Narayana 
 Thagubothu Ramesh
 Hema as frustrated hotel customer
 Chalapathi Rao
 Rao Ramesh 
 Venu Madhav as constable pichheswar rao
 Banerjee
 Chandramouli
 Dhanraj as varam
 Duvvasi Mohan
 Bharath Raju as Nagaraju
 Jayaprakash Reddy as Veera Puli Reddy
 Fish Venkatas Basava ugra Narsimha Reddy's henchman
 Geeta Singh
 Khayyum

Soundtrack 

For the audio launch, a hot air balloon was launched with the lead cast (Naresh, Deekshit, and Chawla) and Manchu Manoj aboard. The songs were released on 31 May 2014. Vijay Ebenezer reused his songs from the original film.

Release 
The Deccan Chronicle gave the film a rating of two-and-a-half out of five and stated that " In all, this is a time-pass film in which you can expect some good laughs in the film’s second half". The Times of India gave the film two out of five stars and wrote that "You better watch the movie to find out what happens, and know finer details like the plot, music, quality of acting, writing and cinematography and the likes".

The film was released on Gemini TV on 14 September 2014.

References

External links 
 

2014 films
Indian romantic comedy-drama films
Telugu remakes of Tamil films
2014 romantic comedy-drama films
Indian slapstick comedy films
2010s Telugu-language films
Reliance Entertainment films
Films directed by E. Satti Babu